Elvis (Epi) Albertus (born 23 December 1966), is a former Aruba football manager. He has coached the Aruba national football team, and is the current coach of Aruban first division side SV La Fama.

References

1966 births
Living people
Aruban football managers
Aruba national football team managers